Machakos School, otherwise known as Machakos High School, is a boys national school located in Machakos county in Kenya.

The school started in a modest way in 1915 as a Boys’ Primary School at the current Machakos Girls grounds. It was known as Africa Government School. It was not until 1939 that it changed into a boys Secondary School. In 1946 the first batch of girls were admitted making it a mixed school. It used to take students up to Form 2. The Principal of the school then was called Mr. Martin making the school to be referred to by the locals as “KwaMatingi” a corruption of for “At Martins”.

Later the need to separate the girls from the boys arose and in 1950 the boys were relocated to the present site of Machakos School. It admitted African students only and hence the name “GovernmentAfricanBoysSchool”. The first principal who was a foreigner (1950) was called Crowford who stayed for 4 years only

Now the current principal is OGW.Indimuli Kahi-Chairman of the Kenya Secondary's Heads Associations (KSSHA)

References

High schools and secondary schools in Kenya
Education in Eastern Province (Kenya)
Machakos County
Boys' schools in Kenya
Educational institutions established in 1939
1939 establishments in Kenya